Request Tracker, commonly abbreviated to RT, is a ticket-tracking software written in Perl used to coordinate tasks and manage requests among an online community of users. RT's first release in 1996 was written by Jesse Vincent, who later formed Best Practical Solutions LLC to distribute, develop, and support the package. RT is open source (FOSS) and distributed under the GNU General Public License.

Request Tracker for Incident Response (RTIR) is a special distribution of RT to fulfill the specific needs of CERT teams.  It was initially developed in cooperation with JANET-CERT, and in 2006 was upgraded and expanded with joint funding from nine Computer Security Incident Response Teams (CSIRTs) in Europe.

Technology
RT is written in Perl and runs on the Apache and lighttpd web servers using mod_perl or FastCGI with data stored in either MySQL, PostgreSQL, Oracle or SQLite. It is possible to extend the RT interface using plug-ins written in Perl.

History
Jesse Vincent, while enrolled at Wesleyan University in 1994, worked for Wesleyan's computing help desk and was responsible for improving the help desk and residential networking software infrastructure. This task included setting up a ticketing system for the help desk. Initially he set up a Linux server to run "req", but later he identified that the command line interface was limiting usage.  Over the next two years he created and maintained WebReq, a web based interface for req written in Perl.  Eventually the req portions were removed and what was left became RT version 1.0.  A complete rewrite occurred for RT version 2.0 when Jesse started to work on RT full-time in 2001 and founded Best Practical Solutions. RT was used by Perl's CPAN, but because of declining use, a sunset date of March 1, 2021, was announced at the Perl NOC on December 4, 2020. rt.cpan.org will sunset on March 1st, 2021. Following a pushback from the developer community, a company was contracted to take over the hosting. rt.cpan.org to remain online.

Interface

RT has many interfaces for creating and updating tickets.  A web interface is available for both logged in users and guest users.  It is easily tailored by granting or denying specific permissions to users as well as by adding custom fields and data to tickets.  Template callbacks allow the modification of the software's web pages without requiring extensive knowledge.

Email is another primary interface to RT and is often the only interface many guest users see.  The email system includes support for auto-responses, attachments, and full customization of the rules which govern to whom and when email is sent.  Emails are stored in RT as correspondence on a ticket, and the software can make a distinction between public replies and private comments to show them as appropriate.

A basic REST-like API and a command-line tool are also  provided as another way to interact with RT.

Integration
 RT integrates with Best Practical's knowledge base application, the RT FAQ Manager ("RTFM"). As of RT 4.0.0, RTFM's functionality was integrated into RT itself as Articles.
 RT also integrates with Best Practical's IT asset management application, "Assets." As of RT 4.4.0, this functionality was integrated into RT itself.
 RT supports the Networked Help Desk API.

See also

 Comparison of help desk issue tracking software
 Comparison of issue tracking systems

References
 "RT Essentials", O'Reilly, 2005, 224 pages

Notes

External links
 

Free software programmed in Perl
Bug and issue tracking software
Perl software